Administrative controls are training, procedure, policy, or shift designs that lessen the threat of a hazard to an individual. Administrative controls typically change the behavior of people (e.g., factory workers) rather than removing the actual hazard or providing personal protective equipment (PPE).

Administrative controls are fourth in larger hierarchy of hazard controls, which ranks the effectiveness and efficiency of hazard controls. Administrative controls are more effective than PPE because they involve some manner of prior planning and avoidance, whereas PPE only serves only as a final barrier between the hazard and worker. Administrative controls are second lowest because they require workers or employers to actively think or comply with regulations and do not offer permanent solutions to problems. Generally, administrative controls are cheaper to begin, but they may become more expensive over time as higher failure rates and the need for constant training or re-certification eclipse the initial investments of the three more desirable hazard controls in the hierarchy. The U.S. National Institute for Occupational Safety and Health recommends administrative controls when hazards cannot be removed or changed, and engineering controls are not practical.

Some common examples of administrative controls include work practice controls such as prohibiting mouth pipetting and rotating worker shifts in coal mines to prevent hearing loss. Other examples include hours of service regulations for commercial vehicle operators, Safety signage for hazards, and regular maintenance of equipment.

References

Industrial hygiene
Safety engineering
Occupational safety and health